Honourable Justice Joseph Adetunji Adefarasin (24 April 1921 – 28 March 1989) was a Nigerian lawyer and High Court judge. He was one of the foremost students of  Igbobi College, Yaba, Lagos from 1932 to 1939 and studied law at University of London from 1946 to 1949.
Joseph Adefarasin was the Second Chief  Judge of Lagos from 1  November 1974 to 24 April 1985.

He was the President of the International Federation of Red Cross and Red Crescent Societies from 1977 to 1981. He was the first African to hold this position and was awarded the Henry Dunant Medal, which is the highest World Red Cross award.

He was married to Hilda Adefarasin. They had five children including Wale Adefarasin, Bola Adefarasin, Yinka Ogundipe, Michael Adeyemi Adefarasin and Paul Adefarasin.

References

External links
 Biography at Red Cross International
 Biography at Nigerian Red Cross

1921 births
1989 deaths
Lagos State judges
Red Cross personnel
People from Ijebu Ode
Presidents of the International Federation of Red Cross and Red Crescent Societies
20th-century Nigerian lawyers
Joseph
Yoruba legal professionals
Nigerian expatriates in the United Kingdom
Igbobi College alumni
Alumni of the University of London